The following is a list of string figures, various figures which can be made using a loop of string, and which occur in games such as cat's cradle. Most of the titles are translations and/or descriptions.

Format
Explanation of the format of these listings:
"name 1" (location of name), [specific citation] "name 2" (location 2): opening position[, extension, notes] [general citation]
subsequent figures

List

See also
Notable string scholars

References
The list includes all figures from Elffers & Schuyt (1979), Gryski (1983) and (1985), ISFA (1999), and Jayne (1962).

External links
Webpages with lists of string figures:
"String Figure of the Month", ISFA.org.
"Index to the Collection", WWW Collection of Favorite String Figures.
"String Figures", Gadan.it.
"Index", String Figure Studio.
"Introduction", Dine String Games.
"Jayne's Finished-Pattern-Only Figures", Neil Parker's homepage.
The Survival, Origin and Mathematics of String Figures.
"Strings on Your Fingers", GardenDigest.com.
"Memoir No. 13: String-Figures From the Gilbert Islands", Journal of the Polynesian Society.
 
 

Gaming-related lists
List